The genus Oxytate, commonly known as grass crab spiders, comprises a homogenous group of nocturnal crab spiders (family Thomisidae). The complete mitochondrial genome of the type species O. striatipes was determined in 2014.

Description
Although they do not construct webs, both sexes possess a silk apparatus. A study of the type species, O. striatipes, revealed that they possess a simpler and more primitive spigot system than other members of the family, as even the females possess neither tubuliform glands for cocoon production, nor triad spigots for web-building. Males and females do however have three types of silk gland, which are classified as ampullate, pyriform and aciniform.

Four ampullate glands are connected to the anterior spinnerets, while eight minor ampullate glands are connected to the median spinnerets. The pyriform glands are connected to the anterior spinnerets (90 in females and 80 in males). The aciniform glands are connected to the median (18–24 in females and 14–20 in males) and posterior spinnerets (60 in either sex).

Green crab spiders are very helpful to honeybee and plants to interact. Oxytate has an ability to reflect UV lights which makes flowers more attractive to honeybees. And by attracting honeybees, it is captured in a trap of crab spiders.

Habits
Like other crab spiders, they are masters of ambush and disguise. They stalk their prey at night, from an ambush position on a grass stem or from the underside of a leaf. They can sense the vibrations caused by invertebrates moving on the leaf's upper side, and quickly pounce on the victim. While in ambush on twigs or grass, the short hind legs hold onto the stem, while the long anterior legs are stretched forward. Their bite is not harmful to humans, unless it would cause an allergic reaction.

Range
They are native to Asia, Western Australia, East, Central and southern Africa.

Species
 it contains 30 species:
 Oxytate argenteooculata (Simon, 1886) — Central, East, Southern Africa
 Oxytate attenuata (Thorell, 1895) — Myanmar
 Oxytate bhutanica Ono, 2001 — Bhutan, China
 Oxytate capitulata Tang & Li, 2009 — China
 Oxytate chlorion (Simon, 1906) — India
 Oxytate clavulata Tang, Yin & Peng, 2008 — China
 Oxytate concolor (Caporiacco, 1947) — Ethiopia
 Oxytate elongata (Tikader, 1980) — India
 Oxytate forcipata Zhang & Yin, 1998 — China
 Oxytate greenae (Tikader, 1980) — Andaman Islands
 Oxytate guangxiensis He & Hu, 1999 — China
 Oxytate hoshizuna Ono, 1978 — China, Japan
 Oxytate isolata (Hogg, 1914) — Western Australia
 Oxytate jannonei (Caporiacco, 1940) — Ethiopia
 Oxytate kanishkai (Gajbe, 2008) — India
 Oxytate leruthi (Lessert, 1943) — West, Central Africa
 Oxytate lobia (Lee, Yoo & Kim, 2021) — Korea
 Oxytate mucunica (Liu, 2022) — China
 Oxytate multa Tang & Li, 2010 — China
 Oxytate palmata (K. Liu, J. Liu & Xu, 2017) — China
 Oxytate parallela (Simon, 1880) — China, Korea
 Oxytate phaenopomatiformis (Strand, 1907) — Zanzibar
 Oxytate placentiformis Wang, Chen & Zhang, 2012 — China
 Oxytate ribes (Jezequel, 1964) — Ivory Coast
 Oxytate sangangensis Tang et al., 1999 — China
 Oxytate striatipes L. Koch, 1878 — Russia, China, Korea, Taiwan, Japan
 Oxytate subvirens (Strand, 1907) — Sri Lanka
 Oxytate taprobane Benjamin, 2001 — Sri Lanka
 Oxytate virens (Thorell, 1891) — Vietnam, Singapore

See also
 Runcinia, also known as grass crab spiders

References 

 
Araneomorphae genera
Spiders of Asia
Spiders of Africa
Spiders of Australia